Boża Wola  is a village in the administrative district of Gmina Siennica, within Mińsk County, Masovian Voivodeship, in east-central Poland.

Its main attraction is "Dworek", a mansion from 19th century. From 1992 it is used by the Prelature of Opus Dei.

References

Villages in Mińsk County